The 1924–25 FA Cup was the 50th season of the world's oldest football cup competition, the Football Association Challenge Cup, commonly known as the FA Cup. Sheffield United won the competition for the fourth time, beating Cardiff City 1–0 in the final at Wembley.

Fans of Sheffield United sang the popular song of the era "It Ain't Gonna Rain No More" during the match.

Matches were scheduled to be played at the stadium of the team named first on the date specified for each round, which was always a Saturday. Some matches, however, might be rescheduled for other days if there were clashes with games for other competitions or the weather was inclement. If scores were level after 90 minutes had been played, a replay would take place at the stadium of the second-named team later the same week. If the replayed match was drawn further replays would be held until a winner was determined. If scores were level after 90 minutes had been played in a replay, a 30-minute period of extra time would be played.

Calendar
The format of the FA Cup for the season had two preliminary rounds, six qualifying rounds, four proper rounds, and the semi finals and final. This was the last season with the Cup in this format, as from the next season onwards, the fifth and sixth qualifying rounds would be renamed to the First and Second Rounds Proper.

First round proper
42 of the 44 clubs from the Football League First Division and Football League Second Division joined the 12 lower-league clubs who came through the qualifying rounds. Two Second Division sides, Port Vale and Coventry City, were entered at the fifth qualifying round, with the Third Division North and South teams, this was the last time Division 1 teams started at this stage of the competition. Amateur side Corinthian were given a free entry to the first round. To make the number of teams up to 64, nine Third Division South sides (none were selected from the Third Division North) were given byes to this round. These were:

Watford
Brighton & Hove Albion
Luton Town
Swindon Town
Northampton Town
Bristol City
Millwall
Swansea Town
Plymouth Argyle

32 matches were scheduled to be played on Saturday, 10 January 1925. Six matches were drawn and went to replays in the following midweek fixture, of which two went to another replay.

Second round proper
The 16 Second Round matches were played on Saturday, 31 January 1925. Five matches were drawn, with replays taking place in the following midweek fixture. One of these then went to a second replay played the following week.

Third round proper
The eight Third Round matches were scheduled for Saturday, 21 February 1925. Four matches were drawn and went to replays in the following midweek fixture.

Fourth round proper
The four Fourth Round matches were scheduled for Saturday, 7 March 1925. There were no replays.

Semi-finals
The semi-final matches were played on Saturday, 28 March 1925. The matches ended in victories for Sheffield United and Cardiff City, who went on to meet in the final at Wembley.

Final

The 1925 FA Cup Final was contested by Sheffield United and Cardiff City at Wembley. Sheffield United won by a single goal, scored by Fred Tunstall.

This was the first time a team outside England had played in an F.A. Cup Final since Queens Park of Glasgow in 1885.

Match details

See also
FA Cup Final Results 1872-

References
General
Official site; fixtures and results service at TheFA.com
1924-25 FA Cup at rsssf.com
1924-25 FA Cup at soccerbase.com

Specific

FA Cup seasons
FA
Cup